Tatyana Aleksandrovna Shemyakina (born 3 September 1987) is a Russian race walker. She was born in Makarovka, Republic of Mordovia.

Career 
Her first international medal was a bronze over 10,000 m at the 2006 World Junior Championships in Athletics. Shemyakina won the silver medal at the 2007 World Championships in Osaka. She entered the 2008 IAAF World Race Walking Cup but failed to finish the distance. She is part of a training group coached by Viktor Chegin.

She was the 20 km champion at the 2007 European Athletics U23 Championships and went on to take the bronze medal at the 2009 European U23 Championships in Kaunas. She was the runner-up at the 2011 Summer Universiade.

She has not competed in the sport since February 2012.

References

External links 

1987 births
Living people
Russian female racewalkers
World Athletics Championships medalists
Universiade medalists in athletics (track and field)
People from Saransk
Universiade silver medalists for Russia
Medalists at the 2011 Summer Universiade
Sportspeople from Mordovia
21st-century Russian women